The Fort Connah Site is a site on the National Register of Historic Places located on U.S. Route 93 between St. Ignatius and Charlo, Montana.  It was added to the Register on April 28, 1982. The fort was established in 1846 by the Hudson's Bay Company.  The remaining building is believed to be the oldest standing in Montana.

References

Forts on the National Register of Historic Places in Montana
National Register of Historic Places in Lake County, Montana
1846 establishments in Montana
Hudson's Bay Company forts in the United States